The Stepladder Mountains are located in southeastern California in the United States. The range, found in San Bernardino County, is home to the 84,199-acre (approximate) Stepladder Mountains Wilderness, which protects the Desert tortoise, California's state reptile.

The dominant vegetation consists of creosote bush scrub on the bajadas, and microphylla woodlands within the washes; palo verde, smoketree, and catclaw are typically the trees found in the woodlands. A small stand of crucifixion thorn and a dense stand of teddy bear cholla are also found in the area. Wildlife is typical for the Mojave Desert; including coyote, black-tailed jackrabbits, ground squirrels, kangaroo rats, quail, roadrunners, rattlesnakes, and several species of lizards.

References

Part of this article incorporates text from the Bureau of Land Management, which is in the Public domain.
California Road and Recreation Atlas, 2005, pg.107

External links
Stepladder Mountains Wilderness - BLM
Stepladder Mountains Wilderness - Wilderness Connect

Mountain ranges of Southern California
Mountain ranges of the Mojave Desert
Mountain ranges of San Bernardino County, California